The Milton rail crash was a crash in 1955, at Milton, Berkshire (now part of Oxfordshire).  A passenger train took a crossover too fast and derailed. Eleven were killed, and 157 were injured.

Overview 
The train failed to slow down for a low speed crossover.

The engine and several carriages rolled down an embankment, which exacerbated the severity of the accident.

Contributing factors 
Because the track involved had been formerly operated by the Great Western Railway, the signals were on the right hand side, but the train was hauled by one of the new British Railways Standard Class 7 locomotives, which had its driving position on the left hand side. This incompatibility hampered the driver's view of the signals.

There was a berth track circuit approaching the crossover, but it was much longer than the train, which made it hard for the signalman to estimate the speed of the train.

Aftermath 
The signals were later modified to prevent a driver seeing a proceed signal for the crossover too soon. This is known as Approach Release.

Handrails on the smoke deflectors also obscured the drivers' view, and these were later removed and replaced with hand holds on all the "Britannia" class locomotives that ran on the Western Region.

See also 

  Jokela rail crash - similar overspeed accident in Finland
  Colwich rail crash - overspeed through turnout, signal aspects a factor
 Lists of rail accidents

References

Further reading 

 "Accident at Milton on 20th November 1955"
 

Derailments in England
Disasters in Oxfordshire
Rail transport in Oxfordshire
Railway accidents in 1955
1955 in England
20th century in Oxfordshire
Accidents and incidents involving British Rail
1955 disasters in the United Kingdom
Rail accidents caused by a driver's error